Jodhaa Akbar is a 2008 Indian historical romance film, co-written, produced and directed by Ashutosh Gowariker. It stars Aishwarya Rai and Hrithik Roshan in the lead roles, with Sonu Sood, Kulbhushan Kharbanda and Ila Arun in supporting roles. Acclaimed composer A. R. Rahman composed the musical score. Set in the 16th century, the film centers on the romance between the Mughal Emperor Jalal-ud-din Muhammad Akbar, played by Hrithik Roshan, and the Rajput Princess Jodhaa Bai who becomes his wife, played by Aishwarya Rai.

Produced on a budget of 400 million, Jodhaa Akbar was released on 15 February 2008 and grossed 1.2 billion. The film was cited as "10 Great Bollywood Films of the 21st Century" by British Film Institute. The film garnered awards and nominations in several categories, with particular praise for its direction, music, cinematography, costume design, choreography and lead performances (Aishwarya and Hrithik). The film won 48 awards from 84 nominations.

Awards and nominations

See also 
 List of Bollywood films of 2008

Notes

References

External links 
 Accolades for Jodhaa Akbar at the Internet Movie Database

Lists of accolades by Indian film